Psammogeton is a genus of flowering plants belonging to the family Apiaceae.

Its native range is Iraq to Central Asia and India, Eastern Arabian Peninsula.

Species:

Psammogeton biternatus 
Psammogeton cabulicus 
Psammogeton canescens 
Psammogeton lamondiae 
Psammogeton ranunculifolius 
Psammogeton registanicus 
Psammogeton stocksii 
Psammogeton ternatus

References

Apiaceae
Apiaceae genera